Tamara Korpatsch was the defending champion, but chose to participate at the 2019 Ladies Open Lausanne instead.

Viktoriya Tomova won the title, defeating Danka Kovinić in the final, 6–2, 5–7, 7–5.

Seeds

Draw

Finals

Top half

Bottom half

References

Main Draw

Engie Open de Biarritz - Singles